Mark Darley (6 April 1926 – 1991) was an Irish equestrian. He competed in two events at the 1952 Summer Olympics.

References

1926 births
1991 deaths
Irish male equestrians
Olympic equestrians of Ireland
Equestrians at the 1952 Summer Olympics
People from Bradford-on-Avon